The 2017–18 Burundi Ligue A season, also known as Primus Ligue for sponsorship reasons, was the 55th edition of the top flight football competition in Burundi. The season started on 16 September 2017 and ended on 27 May 2018.

Teams 
A total of sixteen clubs participate in this season. Thirteen teams from previous season and three new promoted sides.

Promoted from Ligue B
 Flambeau du Centre
 Les Jeunes Athlétiques
 Delta Star Gatumba

Relegated from Ligue A
 Magara Star
 Rusizi 
 Muzinga

League table

See also
2018 Burundian Cup

References

Burundi Premier League seasons
Premier League
Premier League
Burundi